was the 2nd daimyō of Aizu Domain in Mutsu Province, Japan (modern-day Fukushima Prefecture). His courtesy title was Chikuzen-no-kami and Jijū, and his Court rank was Senior Fourth Rank, Lower Grade.

Biography
Masatsune was the fourth son of Hoshina Masayuki and became daimyō in 1669 on the retirement of his father. He understood the construction of his father's monumental grave at Hanitsu Jinja in Inawashiro in 1675. He is also known for reviving the Oyaku-en, a medicinal herbs garden which had been established by the Ashina clan during their tenure over Aizu. However, his tenure was a constant struggle against the machinations of his mother, Shoko-in (1620-1691), who wielded a strong influence and promoted less-than-qualfied relatives to various high posts, including that of karō. He was married to a daughter of Maeda Toshitsune of Kaga Domain, but had only one daughter. He adopted his younger brother, Matsudaira Masakata as his heir and died in 1681.

See also
Hoshina clan

References 
"Aizu-han" on Edo 300 HTML ) 
Noguchi Shin'ichi (2005). Aizu-han. Tokyo: Gendai shokan.

Shinpan daimyo
1647 births
1681 deaths
Aizu-Matsudaira clan
People of Edo-period Japan